The Singapore national rugby union team has yet to make its debut at the Rugby World Cup, though since the 1995 Rugby World Cup, Singapore have been participating in qualification competitions.

History 
The Singapore Cricket Club is said to have been one of the first rugby clubs in Singapore when employees from the British East India Company brought the game to Singapore. For many years in the 1800s and early 1900s the Singapore team that played against other Malayan states was made up of expatriates who were working in Singapore and army servicemen based in Singapore at the time.  With such a large core of servicemen making the "national team" of the time, a Singapore "Civilians XV" also played many games representing the island state.

Up to the 1960s, this representation of Singapore Civilians made up the national team that competed in the annual Malaya Cup that hosted states from around Malaya (now Malaysia). This was the forerunner to the modern day Agong Cup that is currently organised by the Malaysian Rugby Union. This side was made up predominantly of expatriates from the United Kingdom, Australia and New Zealand.

1971 saw the birth of the Under-23 national team when it played against Malaysia in the Anchor Cup curtain raiser match to the England game. The Under-23 team was made up of all national local boys from the Armed forces, Police force, local clubs and schools. In 1972 the SRU under the presidency of ASP Niaz Mohd Shah from the Police Force decided to brave the challenge and form the new all citizens local national rugby team. The Singapore national team participated in the 3rd ARFUT (Asian Rugby Football Union Tournament) in Hong Kong and emerged a credible 4th position. Leow Kim Liat was the captain for the 1972 team, and became the first Asian to ever captain a Singapore representative side, and the first National Captain.

In 1975, Singapore participated in SEAP (South East Asian Peninsular Games) held in Bangkok. However, Singapore lost to both Thailand and Malaysia and emerged 3rd with a bronze medal. In 1977 Singapore took part in the SEA Games held in Malaysia. Singapore bettered their 1975 performance by winning the silver medal after beating hosts Malaysia, but losing to Thailand in a rain sodden finals match.

In 1978, Singapore Rugby achieved its best ever performance in history under coach Natahar Bava. The all citizens local Singapore national won a historic MRU Cup victory in the annual MRU (M'sian Rugby Union) tournament after 44 years of participation under the label of Singapore Civilians. The Singapore team beat the RNZIR (Royal New Zealand Infantry Battalion) in the semi-finals (which was actually the finals in the eyes of many rugby followers). They beat the RMAF Blackhawks in the MRU Cup final. Later that same year Singapore took part in the 6th Asian Rugby tournament held in Kuala Lumpur. They emerged with their best ever result to this day with a 3rd-place finish behind powerhouses, Japan and South Korea when they beat Thailand in a 16-15 3rd placing intriguing game.

For their efforts and achievements SNOC awarded Singapore Rugby with the Sportsman of the Year 1978 award to Song Koon Poh, Coach of the year to Natahar Bava and the entire 1978 national team as Singapore's Sports Team of the year. The Singapore team went on to repeat another MRU Cup win under coach Natahar Bava in 1982, beating the Singapore-based Kiwis RNZIR Battalion in the finals.

Singapore also excelled in rugby sevens game during this period. The team under Natahar Bava achieved their best ever 7s game results during 1978, 1979 and 1980 in the HK 7s tournament. Singapore's best ever rugby 7s results were in the 1978 Plate Finals where they lost to Bahrain 0-10 and in 1979 when they qualified for the top 8 teams Cup quarter finals losing out eventually to Western Samoa 4-16. In 1980 again Singapore lost in the Plate Finals to Japan by 0-40 in a flooded rain sodden game.

Rugby World Cup Qualifiers
Singapore first tried to qualify for a World Cup for the 1995 tournament in South Africa, taking part in the Asia qualifiers. Singapore played out of Group B in Round 1, though they lost their three fixtures and did not advance to Round 2. Singapore attempted to qualify for the 1999 Rugby World Cup in Wales also; playing in Round 1 of Asia, but losing both of their fixtures against Sri Lanka and Thailand.

Singapore finished second in the final standings of Pool A of Round 1 in attempting to qualify for the 2003 Rugby World Cup in Australia, and did not advance to Round 2. They finished second in their group in qualification for the 2007 Rugby World Cup in France as well, losing one match and winning one.

Makeup of the National Team

The current makeup of the National Team sees a mix of local born and bred Singaporean players and expatriates who fulfil World Rugby eligibility rules. The entirety of the team is based in Singapore, and are selected from all the Premiership clubs that play in the top division of the local league organised by the Singapore Rugby Union. While there has been past selection debates on an over reliance of expatriate players, the local development programme (National Rugby Academy) has seen success only at age group levels and hence see more local players through the ranks. Regrettably whilst development of the game has been successful at the schools level & in organizing international games & tournaments events here in Singapore in conjunction with the Tourism Board, we do not see the local rugby lads progressing strongly as an all citizens national rugby team as once evident back in the 1980s.

Asian 5 Nations Competition
Singapore have been competitors in the Asian 5 Nations competition since the inaugural 2008 tournament. In 2009 they competed in the premier division of the series.  They kept the tournament winners Japan to a 30-point deficit, the smallest of any of Japan's games.

References

External links
 Singapore Rugby Union
 Singapore on IRB.com
 Singapore on rugbydata.com

 
Asian national rugby union teams
Rugby union in Singapore